Owairaka is a suburb of New Zealand's largest city, Auckland. It is under the local governance of the Auckland Council.

Owairaka is home to the Owairaka Athletic Club which is based at the Lovelock Track where five world records have been set. During the 1960s the club came to prominence in middle- and long-distance running under coach Arthur Lydiard, producing international and national champions including Murray Halberg and the New Zealand Athlete of the Century, Peter Snell.

Demographics

Owairaka had a population of 5,268 at the 2018 New Zealand census, an increase of 318 people (6.4%) since the 2013 census, and an increase of 327 people (6.6%) since the 2006 census. There were 1,665 households, comprising 2,742 males and 2,520 females, giving a sex ratio of 1.09 males per female, with 1,041 people (19.8%) aged under 15 years, 1,365 (25.9%) aged 15 to 29, 2,442 (46.4%) aged 30 to 64, and 423 (8.0%) aged 65 or older.

Ethnicities were 39.7% European/Pākehā, 8.9% Māori, 18.3% Pacific peoples, 39.2% Asian, and 6.4% other ethnicities. People may identify with more than one ethnicity.

The percentage of people born overseas was 47.5, compared with 27.1% nationally.

Although some people chose not to answer the census's question about religious affiliation, 38.3% had no religion, 35.6% were Christian, 0.5% had Māori religious beliefs, 8.5% were Hindu, 7.1% were Muslim, 2.3% were Buddhist and 3.2% had other religions.

Of those at least 15 years old, 1,452 (34.4%) people had a bachelor's or higher degree, and 495 (11.7%) people had no formal qualifications. 663 people (15.7%) earned over $70,000 compared to 17.2% nationally. The employment status of those at least 15 was that 2,214 (52.4%) people were employed full-time, 579 (13.7%) were part-time, and 225 (5.3%) were unemployed.

Education

The local state secondary school is Mount Albert Grammar School .

References

External links
Photographs of Owairaka held in Auckland Libraries' heritage collections.

Suburbs of Auckland